Barrie is a city in Southern Ontario, Canada, about  north of Toronto. The city is within Simcoe County and located along the shores of Kempenfelt Bay, the western arm of Lake Simcoe. Although physically in Simcoe County, Barrie is politically independent. The city is part of the extended urban area in southern Ontario known as the Greater Golden Horseshoe. As of the 2021 census, the city's population was 147,829, while the census metropolitan area had a population of 212,667 residents.

The area was first settled during the War of 1812 as a supply depot for British forces, and Barrie was named after Sir Robert Barrie. The city has grown significantly in recent decades due to the emergence of the technology industry. It is connected to the Greater Golden Horseshoe by Ontario Highway 400 and GO Transit. Significant sectors of the city's diversified economy include education, healthcare, information technology and manufacturing.

History

Before 1900 
Barrie is situated on the traditional land of the Wendat and Anishinaabeg peoples. At its inception, Barrie was an establishment of houses and warehouses at the foot of the Nine Mile Portage from Kempenfelt Bay to Fort Willow, an indigenous transportation route that existed centuries before Europeans arrived in Simcoe County. The portage linked Kempenfelt Bay through Willow Creek, connecting Lake Simcoe to the Nottawasaga River which flows into Georgian Bay off Lake Huron.

Barrie played an integral role in the War of 1812. During the war, the city became a supply depot for British forces and, in addition, the Nine Mile Portage was adopted by the British military as a key piece of their supply line which provided a strategic path for communication, personnel and vital supplies and equipment to and from Fort Willow and Georgian Bay/Lake Huron. Today, the Nine Mile Portage is marked by signs along roads in Barrie and in Springwater Township. The scenic path from Memorial Square to Fort Willow is accessible to visitors year-round.

In 1815, Treaty 16 was signed, which transferred 250,000 acres of land from the Chippewa people to the colonial government. In 1818, Treaty 18 was signed, which resulted in the surrender of an additional 1,592,000 acres of land. The British supply depot would continue to prove useful for portaging Europeans and settlers making their way to northern and western Upper Canada.

The city was named in 1833 after Sir Robert Barrie, who was in charge of the naval forces in Canada and frequently commanded forces through the city and along the Nine Mile Portage. Barrie was also the final destination for a branch of the Underground Railroad. In the mid-19th century, this network of secret routes allowed many American slaves to enter Barrie and the surrounding area. This contributed to the development (and name) of nearby Shanty Bay. In 1846, the population of Barrie was roughly 500, mostly from England, Ireland and Scotland. A private school, three churches, a brick courthouse and a limestone jail, (built in 1842), were in operation. Local businesses included three taverns, six stores, three tanneries, a wagon maker, a bakery, a cabinet maker and six shoemakers, as well as a bank.

By 1869, Barrie became the county seat of Simcoe County, flourishing with a population of over 3,000 people. With this population increase came the establishment of prominent businesses and landmarks. In 1850, Edward Marks had established the Barrie Hotel (now called the Queen's Hotel), the oldest continuously running hotel in Barrie, James and Joseph Anderton established the Anderton Brewery in 1869, which would go on to be one of Barrie's largest employers for years, and Edmund Lally opened one of the Canadian Bank of Commerce's original branches in Barrie in 1867. A line of the Northern Railway was opened in 1853, connecting Barrie with Toronto and several other municipalities in Simcoe County and Muskoka. The Hamilton and North-Western Railway (H&NW) also ran through Barrie, and the two railways would eventually reorganize into the Northern and North Western Railway in June 1879. Allandale Station was the primary train station serving Barrie at the time. The Grand Trunk Railway purchased the original Northern Railway in 1888, and the line serving Barrie would become a branch of the Canadian National Railway (CPR). Throughout the latter of the 19th century, steamships ran from Barrie to the Muskoka Territory, Orillia and other communities and stages were taking passengers to Penetanguishene.

The period of 1870 to 1890 defined Barrie's downtown development with a series of raging fires that sequentially destroyed multiple landmarks, giving rise to the moniker that Barrie was "among the best burning towns in Canada." Many local businesses like breweries, tanneries and sawmills depended on fire to operate, endangering the ramshackle assortment of wooden homes and buildings that made up the city centre.

One of the most destructive fires came in mid-1875 when the entire section north of Dunlop Street to Collier Street, bounded by Clapperton and Owen Streets, was reduced to ash, destroying around 20 local businesses.

20th century 
In the next century, the modern streets and buildings of Barrie began to take form in a massive rebuilding process. Other landmarks to eventually burn down over the years include the Queen's Hotel (1915) and two of Barrie's largest and most prominent companies; the Sevigny Carriage Shop and the Anderton Brewery in 1916.

During the First World War, residents of Barrie helped to construct Canadian Forces Base Borden (CFB Borden) as a means of additional support and to serve as a major training centre of Canadian Expeditionary Force battalions. The base would open on July 11, 1916, and since then has become the largest Canadian Forces Base in Canada, playing an important role through the remainder of the war by training some 350,000 troops for deployment in Europe.

The station's  auxiliary tower was also destroyed with damage to the main studio building. CKVR returned to the air on September 19 at a reduced power of 40,000 watts until a new  tower was built in 1978.

The 1980s and 1990s was a period of substantial growth for Barrie, with the population tripling in the span of 25 years. In 1981, the city had a population of 38,423; in 2006, Barrie had 128,430 residents living within city limits. The first larger scale developments would begin during this time, including high-density waterfront condos and the new Barrie City Hall which started construction in October 1985.

On May 31, 1985, Barrie was struck by a devastating F4 tornado that killed eight people. Over 600 homes were damaged or destroyed by the tornado, and of those roughly one-third were rendered uninhabitable. About 155 people were also injured during the storm, and the tornado remains today one of the most destructive and violent in Canadian history. The tornado caused $150 million (1985 CAD), equivalent to $326 million CAD as of 2022.

Between June 12–13, 1987, a sculpture called Spirit Catcher by Ron Baird was moved to Barrie from Vancouver, British Columbia, where it had been exhibited as part of Expo '86. The sculpture was permanently erected at the foot of Maple Avenue on the shore of Kempenfelt Bay and has since become a major Barrie landmark and tourist attraction. However, with the re-development along the waterfront and Lakeshore Drive, the city is considering moving the Spirit Catcher to a gravel outcropping at the foot of Bayfield Street.

21st century 
On January 12, 2004, the former Molsons plant was found to be home to an illegal marijuana grow-op housing an estimated 30,000 marijuana plants with an estimated street value of $30 million; at the time, it was the largest marijuana grow-op bust in Canada's history.

Barrie's Park Place (formerly Molson Park) was chosen to host Live 8 Canada on July 2, 2005. The overall success of the concert helped support a plan to convert the former Molson Park lands into a commercial district. Construction of Park Place began in 2008 but was temporarily interrupted by the Great Recession and an Ontario Municipal Board (OMB) appeal that proposed a rezoning of the Park Place lands that was initially denied by the City of Barrie. Construction resumed in 2010.

An explosion in the Royal Thai restaurant, housed in the landmark Wellington Hotel at the "Five Points" intersection in downtown Barrie, occurred at 11:20pm on December 6, 2007. The fire quickly spread to several neighbouring buildings and firefighters battled the blaze well into the following morning, requiring assistance from other Simcoe County fire services. Officials estimated the damages to be in the millions. The 100-year-old Wellington Hotel building collapsed later in the morning. On February 17, 2008, two people were charged in connection with the fire after the Ontario Fire Marshal's office concluded the explosion and subsequent fire were the result of arson.

In 2013, Barrie was twinned with the English town of Harrogate as a result of Sir Robert Barrie's close connection to it.

On July 15, 2021, a tornado struck neighbourhoods in south Barrie, leaving several people injured and causing serious damage to property.  Environment Canada categorized it as an EF2 on the Enhanced Fujita scale.

Geography 
It is accessible via Highways 26, 400 and 11 and has convenient access to Highway 401, the Highway 407 Express Toll Route and to neighbouring Toronto. Toronto Pearson International Airport is less than a one-hour drive from Barrie via Highway 400.

Barrie's historic downtown area is situated in a distinct curved or wrapped valley, surrounding the western edge of Kempenfelt Bay. Terrain is generally flat near the city's centre. Moving up the valley slopes toward the city's north and south ends, the terrain can be rather steep in some areas.

Barrie falls into Plant Hardiness Zone 5b. The city does not have any major rivers within its limits but does have numerous creeks and streams, most of which empty into Kempenfelt Bay.

Intraurban communities 

 Allandale
 Ardagh Bluffs
 Craighurst
 Cundles
 Dalston
 Downtown
 Eastview
 Ferndale
 Holly
 Horseshoe Valley
 Letitia Heights
 Little Lake
 Minet's Point
 Painswick
 St. Paul's
 The Grove

Expansion 
Barrie has been designated an Urban Growth Centre by the Province of Ontario. As one of the fastest growing cities in Canada, this designation aims to mitigate urban sprawl and concentrate higher-density development in areas specified by the City of Barrie. Its population growth can be attributed to the emergence of the city as a bedroom community for Toronto. In 1991, Barrie had a population of 62,728 and by 2017, Barrie had an estimated population of 147,000. By 2031, the city's population is expected to exceed 200,000 people. To plan for the continued growth of the city, Barrie successfully annexed  of land from the neighbouring Town of Innisfil to the south and southeast on January 1, 2010. The annexation comprised lands south beyond McKay Road and west of the 10th Sideroad, and as far south as Lockhart Road on the east side of the 10th Sideroad. The annexation allows Barrie to meet its future population needs without having to extend into the countryside north, east and west of the city. Intensification and infilling are simultaneously being undertaken in and near the downtown core to foster a more active urban environment within the city.

Climate 

Barrie has a humid continental climate (Köppen climate classification Dfb), with warm, humid summers, and cold, snowy winters. Barrie is 1.2 °C from the hot summer humid continental climate isotherm, which requires the mean temperature in the hottest month to be  or greater.

Winters are cold with frequent snowfall, the January average high temperature being . Barrie is located in a snowbelt, a region that experiences regular lake-effect snow every year. Snow squalls are a common occurrence between November and January when the water is warmest on Lake Huron and Georgian Bay. The city averages  of snow annually, the brunt of which coming from lake-effect snow events. Alberta clippers and Colorado lows also generate ample snowfall in the region.

Summers in Barrie are warm and sometimes hot, humid, and long with pleasant summer-like temperatures persisting into October most years. Thunderstorms are very common in the summer months in Barrie due to the city being in a convergence zone. Thunderstorms can occasionally be severe, bringing with them torrential rain, very strong winds and hail. Tornadoes are generally rare in the city however an F4 tornado did strike Barrie in 1985. Barrie's average frost-free period is from May 6 to October 8, allowing a growing season of 157 days.

Precipitation falls year round but is typically heaviest in the summer months due to thunderstorm activity. November is also a wet month, receiving  of precipitation in the form of both rain and snow. October interestingly remains relatively dry in comparison to the months preceding and succeeding it. Despite this however, October has the most precipitation days and rainy days out of every month with 15.6 and 15.5 respectively.

Demographics 

Ethnicity 
As of the 2021 census Barrie was approximately 77.9% white, 17.1% visible minorities and 5.0% Indigenous. The largest visible minority groups in the city were South Asian (4.4%), Black (3.9%), Latin American (2%), Chinese (1.6%) and Filipino (1.4%). 

Note: Totals greater than 100% due to multiple origin responses.

Language 
The city's French-speaking population was notable with 9,710 people (6.6% of the total population) capable of speaking French. Some 84.4% of the population spoke mostly English at home.

Religion 
According to the 2021 Census, Barrie was 52.5% Christian, down from 66.3% in 2011. 23.6% of Barrie residents were Catholic, 15.9% were Protestants, 8.2% were Christians of unspecified denomination, and 1.5% were Christian Orthodox. Adherents to other denominations of Christianity and Christian-related traditions accounted for 3.4% of the population. 40.8% of Barrie residents were nonreligious/secular, up from 31.0% in 2011. All other religions and spiritual traditions combined make up 6.7% of residents. The largest non-Christian religions in Barrie are Islam (2.5%), Hinduism (1.5%), and Sikhism (0.8%).

Economy 
The following are some of the city's major employers:

 Royal Victoria Regional Health Centre
 Georgian College and the associated University Partnership Centre and Centre for Health and Wellness
 City of Barrie
 County of Simcoe
 Simcoe County District School Board
 TD Canada Trust and TD Waterhouse Regional Centre
 TD Canada Trust Technology and Operations Centre
 Scotiabank Regional Centre
 BMO Data Centre
 IBM Canada Leadership Data Centre
 The Source Distribution Centre
 Coca-Cola Bottling Company
Canadian Mental Health Association - Simcoe 
 Hydro One Ontario Grid Control Centre

In recent decades however Barrie's economy has diversified, and the local population's reliance on commuting to Toronto has decreased. The city's economy is rooted in retail, education, healthcare, services, manufacturing and technology. Major employers in the city include the Simcoe County District School Board with 6,000 employees along with the Simcoe Muskoka Catholic District School Board with 3,400 employees, Georgian College with 2,500 employees and the Royal Victoria Hospital with 2,465 employees.

Barrie has emerged as a growing tech-hub with several companies such as IBM and BMO constructing data centres in the city. Although not as prominent as cities like Markham or Waterloo in the tech industry, Barrie is considered one of the best high-tech centres in the country for small markets.

Tourism 
Tourism plays an important role in the local economy. Barrie's historic downtown and waterfront are at the heart of its tourism industry. Downtown Barrie hosts many older buildings that have been kept up over the years or given new facades that exemplify their historical importance. Many speciality shops, boutiques, pubs and restaurants are located throughout downtown Barrie, most notably along Dunlop Street East. Downtown Barrie is becoming well known for its fashion boutiques, local art, live theatre, indie-music and nightlife scenes. In addition, downtown Barrie is home to numerous annual festivals and events such as The Barrie Waterfront Festival, Barrielicious, Winterfest, Celebrate Barrie, Ecofest, Jazz & Blues Festival, Promenade Days, Ribfest and Craft Beer Show, Caribfest, Lawnchair Luminata, Kempenfest, The New Music Festival, Barrie Film Festival, Santa Claus Parade and the New Year's Countdown.

In the summer months, the city boasts several beaches including Minet's Point Beach, Johnsons Beach, The Gables, Tyndale Beach, and Centennial Beach. Boating is also very popular in Kempenfelt Bay and Lake Simcoe as it connects to the Trent Severn Waterway. In 2011, Barrie's waterfront was under redevelopment, with the relocation of several roadways to provide more greenspace and parkland along the lakeshore. There are numerous winter recreation activities and facilities in the surrounding area, including skiing, snow tubing and snowboarding resorts, snowmobile, snowshoe and Nordic skiing trails, and ice fishing. Recreational activities include skiing at nearby Horseshoe Resort, Snow Valley, Mount St. Louis Moonstone, Blue Mountain and Hardwood Ski and Bike.

Arts and culture 

Barrie is home to vibrant performing and fine arts scenes. There are a number of live performance companies including Theatre by the Bay, Talk Is Free Theatre and the Huronia Symphony. Grove Park Home is the practice hall for On-Stage Performance Group which performs in Cookstown. The Strolling Youth Players and the Kempenfelt Community Players also all perform in Barrie. In addition, an annual live concert series is hosted by Georgian College.

Performing arts 
There are two main performing arts venues in the city: the Five Points Theatre, and the Georgian Theatre. Originally, the Five Points Theatre was known as The Mady Centre For The Performing Arts, but it was renamed in January 2018. It is located in Barrie's downtown at the Five Points intersection and was completed in 2011. This modern facility is home to many professional and amateur cultural productions, film screenings, theatrical plays, concerts, dance recitals and other performances. It is also the main venue for Theatre by the Bay and the Talk Is Free Theatre Companies. The venue features a flexible stage area with lighting and sound for professional theatre, music, dance, and other presentations, an automated riser/seating system with capacity for 120-200 seats and a sprung performance floor.

The Georgian Theatre is a professional performing arts facility located in Barrie's north end on the campus of Georgian College. The theatre features a proscenium stage, sound, lights, fly gallery and seating for 427 on the main level with three pods which can be used to increase the seating capacity to 690. The Theatre is used for both theatrical and non-theatrical activity including conferences and seminars.

Galleries 

The prominent MacLaren Art Centre is located in Barrie. This is an art gallery that inspired the "Art City" project, which has had many different large sculptures installed around the city. These can be found in parks and along the waterfront.

Barrie is also home to many independent galleries and studios. A concentration of independent galleries, studios and boutiques is located in Lakeshore Mews. This area is located behind the downtown's Dunlop Street. Lakeshore Mews artists also organize the annual "Arts ce Soir"; an all-night contemporary art event in celebration of visual, musical, theatrical and literary art.

In addition, a studio tour in the Barrie/Orillia area takes place on the Canadian Thanksgiving weekend every year. It is called the Images Studio Tour and has over 25 artists on average. Potters, jewellers, painters, textile artists and fashion designers make up a few of the disciplines of the talents on display.

Festivals 
Barrie is home to Kempenfest; one of the largest outdoor arts and crafts celebrations in Ontario. This festival occurs annually over the August long weekend and features over 300 artisans, an antique show, food demonstrations, children's activities and live entertainment, including an indie-music stage.

Groups 
Some of the main arts and culture groups in the city include:
 Barrie Art Club
 Barrie Concert Band
 Barrie Film Festival
 Barrie Folk Society
 Campus Gallery
 Caribbean Culture Institute
 Huronia Symphony Orchestra
 Kempenfelt Community Players
 King Edward Choir
 Lyrica Chamber Choir
 Simcoe Contemporary Dancers
 Talk Is Free Theatre
 Theatre By The Bay
 Kiwanis

Attractions 
Barrie has numerous recreational venues and community centres throughout the city:
 Allandale Recreation Centre
 Barrie Community Sports Complex
 Barrie Public Library
 Barrie Uptown Theater
 Dorian Parker Centre
 East Bayfield Community Centre
 Eastview Arena
 Holly Community Centre
 Lampman Park
 Lampman Lane Community Centre
 Parkview Community Centre
 Southshore Community Centre
 Victoria Village
 YMCA of Barrie
 Shak's World Community Centre

Sports 

Barrie is also home to the Mariposa School of Skating, which has trained many world-class figure skaters, including Brian Orser, Elvis Stojko and Jeffrey Buttle.

Government

Municipal 

The current mayor of Barrie is Alex Nuttall, who was elected in October 2022, succeeding Jeff Lehman.

Provincial

Federal

Military 
Barrie has a long military history dating back to at least the Nine Mile Portage of the War of 1812. By the time of the 1837 Rebellion, Simcoe County had a sufficient population to form a battalion of Sedentary Militia of almost 600 strong. This battalion was involved in marching suspected rebels down Yonge Street to Toronto in order to face justice. By 1855, Barrie was home to an independent company of Rifle Company of militia, followed in 1863 by a company of Infantry. These companies served during the Fenian Raids. With the Militia Act of 1866, the companies in Barrie were respectively organized as Number 1 and Number 5 companies, in the newly formed 35th Battalion of Infantry (Simcoe Foresters), gazetted on September 14, 1866.

In 1885, four companies from the 35th Simcoe Foresters, including those from Barrie, along with four companies from the 12th York Battalion came together to form the York-Simcoe Battalion. This specially raised battalion served in Western Canada during the North-West Rebellion, under the command of Lieutenant-Colonel W.E. O'Brien of Shanty Bay, Ontario. For its efforts, The Simcoe Foresters received its first Battle Honour "North West Canada 1885". Citizens of Barrie would next volunteer for military service during the Boer War in South Africa from 1899 to 1902. It was during this conflict that at the Battle of Paardeberg, the citizens of Barrie and The Simcoe Foresters suffered their first fatal casualty, Private James Halkett Findlay. Private Findlay was killed-in-action on February 18, 1900, while serving with C Company of the 2nd Battalion Royal Canadian Regiment of Infantry.

In 1914, the First World War broke out and many citizens of Barrie were quick to volunteer for service overseas with The Simcoe Foresters. Late the following year, the Regiment was tasked with raising two overseas battalions, the 157th Battalion (Simcoe Foresters), CEF and the 177th Battalion (Simcoe Foresters), CEF. In the spring of 1916, the Barrie and Collingwood companies of the 157th Battalion began clearing the land for the construction of a new military camp on the Simcoe Pines Plain — Camp Borden (now CFB Borden). This began Barrie's long friendship with the Base, hence the reason CFB Borden was used for Canada's Worst Driver 2 and Canada's Worst Driver 5.

With a re-organization of the Canadian Militia between the two world wars, The Simcoe Foresters, headquartered in Barrie, were amalgamated in 1936 with the Grey Regiment, headquartered at Owen Sound, Ontario. This event created the present-day regiment of The Grey and Simcoe Foresters, which is headquartered at the Armoury in Queen's Park, downtown Barrie. With the outbreak of the Second World War in 1939, citizens of Barrie volunteered for service overseas with The Grey and Simcoe Foresters, the Royal Canadian Navy and the Royal Canadian Air Force. The City of Barrie sponsored a ship in the Royal Canadian Navy, HMCS Barrie, a Flower-class corvette.

Transportation

Airports 
There are no major airports with scheduled flights near Barrie (the closest being Toronto Pearson International Airport, located in Mississauga). There are a few airports that are used for light aviation aircraft:

 Lake Simcoe Regional Airport
 Barrie/Little Lake Water Aerodrome
 Springwater (Barrie Airpark) Aerodrome

Roads 
Barrie is served by Provincial Highway 400, which acts as the primary route between Barrie and Toronto. Highway 400 bisects the city on a roughly north–south basis. Highway 26, also located in the city, is the main route to the Collingwood area and is known as Bayfield Street within the city limits. Barrie was once served by Highway 27, Highway 90, Highway 93, Highway 131 and Highway 11. However, the province downgraded many highways in 1997 and 1998; these highways are now known as Simcoe County Road 27, Simcoe County Road 90 (Dunlop Street), and Simcoe County Road 93.

The portion of Highway 11 through Barrie is known as Yonge Street, though it is actually part of the Penetanguishene Road. Major arterial roads within the city include Mapleview Drive, Ferndale Drive, 10th Line, Big Bay Point Road, Essa Road, Huronia Road, Bayfield Street, Cundles Road, Anne Street, Dunlop Street, Livingstone Street, Duckworth Street, Wellington Street and St. Vincent Street.

Public transit 
Public transport is provided by Barrie Transit, which operates numerous bus routes within the city. Accessible transit is offered by booking with city run Barrie Accessible Community Transportation Service. Most regular bus routes operated by Barrie Transit are accessible using low floor vehicles.
Barrie also has GO Trains and Buses.

Interurban/commuter rail 
GO Transit connects the city to the Greater Toronto Area through daily train service along the Barrie line, with trains operating from the Allandale Waterfront GO Station and the Barrie South GO Station. This is primarily a commuter rail service to the GTA, with southbound trips to Toronto's Union Station in the morning rush hour and northbound trips in the evening rush hour. Limited weekend service to and from Toronto is also operated. Barrie was once a stop for the Northlander train but re-routing resulted in the termination of service. The former Barrie station serving the Northlander still exists north of the Allandale GO Station.

Interurban/commuter bus 
In addition to train service, GO Transit offers daily commuter-oriented bus service to the Greater Toronto Area.  Ontario Northland operates bus routes from various locations to and from Barrie. All inter-urban buses operate from the Barrie Transit Terminal at 24 Maple Street.

Barrie once had been served by various private interurban bus lines such as Penetang-Midland Coach Lines and Greyhound Canada, which ran buses between Barrie and Toronto's Yorkdale Bus Terminal. Greyhound operated QuickLink commuter service from Barrie to Toronto seven days a week. In the past Gray Coach offered service from Toronto to Barrie; the route was later acquired by Greyhound. Greyhound Canada ended all service in Ontario on May 13, 2021.

Barrie is also served by Simcoe County LINX, which provides services between municipalities within Simcoe County, including Orillia, Midland and Penetanguishine.

Passenger rail 
Historically, Barrie was served by scheduled passenger rail service. Allandale Station was a stop for the Grand Trunk Railway, Canadian National Railway and Via Rail. In addition, Ontario Northland's Northlander used the station as a stop, as did CN Rail/Via Rail (namely The Canadian). Regular passenger rail service to the station ended in the 1980s and has largely been replaced by interurban / commuter rail service.

Education 
Barrie has two major English school boards that operate inside the city at a public level. The Simcoe County District School Board administers a public education in Barrie and Simcoe County, while the Simcoe Muskoka Catholic District School Board administers to the Catholic population and serves the Simcoe and Muskoka areas. It also has two French school boards, Conseil scolaire catholique MonAvenir (formerly Conseil scolaire de district catholique Centre-Sud), the Catholic board, and Conseil scolaire Viamonde (CSV, formerly Conseil Scolaire de District du Centre-Sud-Ouest), the secular board. There are also several private schools both for K-8 and K-12.

High schools 
 Barrie North Collegiate Institute
 Bear Creek Secondary School
 Eastview Secondary School
 École secondaire catholique Nouvelle-Alliance
 Innisdale Secondary School
 Maple Ridge Secondary School
 St. Joseph's High School
 Saint Joan of Arc
 St. Peter's Catholic Secondary School
 École secondaire Roméo-Dallaire
 Unity Christian High School

Georgian College 
Georgian College's main campus, with over 10,000 full-time students and approximately 25,000 part-time students, is located in Barrie.

Media

Online 
Village Media operates BarrieToday.com.

Print 
There are both semi-weekly and monthly newspapers serving the City of Barrie. The Barrie Advance, published by Metroland Media Group, is a free newspaper established in 1983 and delivered weekly (on Thursdays) to every residence in the city as well as residents of Springwater Township and parts of Oro-Medonte. The newspaper contains local news, classifieds, advertisements and flyers. Barrie Business is a free newsprint publication covering local and regional business news. Published monthly and distributed to every business in the City of Barrie through Canada Post, it seeks to highlight and support Barrie's local business community and events. The Barrie Examiner, established in 1864, was one of Canada's oldest daily newspapers. It was distributed five days a week (Tuesday to Saturday) to paid subscribers and also delivered to the remainder of the market free on Thursdays. The Examiner was one of several Postmedia Network newspapers purchased by Torstar in a transaction between the two companies in 2017. Following the acquisition, Torstar subsidiary Metroland Media Group announced the closure of the paper effective November 27, 2017.

Television

CKVR-DT (currently part of the CTV 2 television system) is the only local television station in Barrie. It produces approximately 1.30 hours of local news on weekdays and 1 hour of local news on weekends.

Television stations and rebroadcasters based in the vicinity of Barrie Region are:

Radio
Local radio stations serving Barrie and environs include:
 FM 93.1 - CHAY ("Fresh 93.1"), Top 40
 FM 95.7 - CFJB ("Rock 95"), active rock
 FM 100.3 - CJLF ("Life 100.3"), Christian radio
 FM 101.1 - CIQB ("Big 101"), Classic Hits
 FM 107.5 - CKMB ("1075 Kool FM"), hot adult contemporary

Notable people 

 Brent Burns (born 1985), professional ice hockey defenceman for the Carolina Hurricanes
 Rebecca Hornbrook (born 1975), atmospheric chemist at the National Center for Atmospheric Research
 Michael Hutchinson (born 1990), professional ice hockey goaltender
 Gordon Meeking (born 1890), retired NHL player
 Slava Pastuk (born 1990), music journalist and author of Bad Trips.
 Darrin Shannon (born 1969), retired NHL player
 Darryl Shannon (born 1968), retired NHL player

See also
 Barrie Police Service
 Barrie Speedway
 Georgian Mall
 Sandy Hollow Landfill

References

External links

 
Cities in Ontario
Populated places on the Underground Railroad
Single-tier municipalities in Ontario
Populated places on Lake Simcoe